

The Kolbe electrolysis or Kolbe reaction is an organic reaction named after Hermann Kolbe. The Kolbe reaction is formally a decarboxylative dimerisation of two carboxylic acids (or carboxylate ions). The overall reaction is:

If a mixture of two different carboxylates are used, all combinations of them are generally seen as the organic product structures:

 3 R1COO− + 3 R2COO− → R1−R1 + R1−R2 + R2−R2 + 6 CO2 + 6 e−

The reaction mechanism involves a two-stage radical process: electrochemical decarboxylation gives a radical intermediate, which combine to form a covalent bond. As an example, electrolysis of acetic acid yields ethane and carbon dioxide:
CH3COOH → CH3COO− → CH3COO· → CH3· + CO2 
2CH3· → CH3CH3

Another example is the synthesis of 2,7-dimethyl-2,7-dinitrooctane from  4-methyl-4-nitrovaleric acid:

Further reading

See also
 Electrosynthesis
 Wurtz reaction

References

External links
 

Organic redox reactions
Electrolysis
Name reactions